Malacothrips is a genus of thrips in the family Phlaeothripidae.

Species
 Malacothrips adranes
 Malacothrips afer
 Malacothrips antennata
 Malacothrips curepe
 Malacothrips fasciatus
 Malacothrips faurei
 Malacothrips mediator
 Malacothrips natalensis
 Malacothrips praeclarus
 Malacothrips pretoriensis
 Malacothrips riverai
 Malacothrips roycei
 Malacothrips tunapuna
 Malacothrips vigilatus
 Malacothrips zonatus

References

Phlaeothripidae
Thrips
Thrips genera